Valerij Sergeyevich Popov (born 10 September 1974) is a Russian chess player. He was awarded the title Grandmaster by FIDE in 1999.

Popov won the championship of Saint Petersburg, his native city, in 2001 and 2006. In 2014 he shared first place with Denis Yevseev, who took the title on tiebreak score. Popov competed in the inaugural FIDE World Cup in 2005. Here he was knocked out by Alexander Onischuk in the first round by a score of ½–1½.

In 2008, Popov finished second in the European Rapid Chess Championship in Warsaw, Poland with a score of 10½/13 points. Ten years later, he took the gold medal in this championship in Skopje, Macedonia with the same score.

External links

Popov, Valerij profile at Russian Chess Federation (in Russian)
Valerij Popov chess games at 365Chess.com

References

1974 births
Living people
Chess grandmasters
Russian chess players
Sportspeople from Saint Petersburg